Chellaston and Swarkestone railway station was a station at Chellaston in Derbyshire, England.

History

It was originally known as Chellaston, but on 13 June 1901 the Midland Railway renamed it Chellaston and Swarkestone.

The London, Midland and Scottish Railway withdrew passenger services in 1930 and British Railways closed the line in about 1966.

Services

References

Disused railway stations in Derby
Former Midland Railway stations
Railway stations in Great Britain opened in 1868
Railway stations in Great Britain closed in 1930